Moallem Kola (also Romanized as Mo‘allem Kolā and Mo‘allem Kalā) is a village in Harazpey-ye Shomali Rural District, Sorkhrud District, Mahmudabad County, Mazandaran Province, Iran. At the 2006 census, its population was 2,448, in 652 families.

References 

Populated places in Mahmudabad County